The Afghan ambassador to Pakistan is the top-level diplomatic representative of Afghanistan in Pakistan. The ambassador is in charge of the Afghan embassy in Islamabad. It is politically an important Afghan diplomatic post, due to the Afghan–Pakistani bilateral relationship.

List of ambassadors

 Sardar Najibullah Khan (December 1947 – 1948)
 Sardar Shah Wali Khan (1948–1949)
 Sardar Atiq Khan (1952 – c. 1955)
 Abdul Zahir (1958–1961)
Diplomatic relations were terminated on 6 September 1961 and restored on 28 May 1963.
 Mohammad Hashim Maiwandwal (1963–1964)
 Mohammad Nur Ahmad Etemadi (1964–1965)
 Ali Ahmad Popal (28 June 1969 – c. 1973)
 Mohammad Nur Ahmad Etemadi (1976–1978)
 Mahmoud Baryalai  (1978- 1979)
 Mohammad Siddiq Saljouki (c. 1992)
 Masoud Khalili (1995)
 Abdul Hakeem Mujahid (1998)
 Mullah Mohammad Said-ur-Rehman Haqqani (1998–2000)
 Mullah Abdul Salam Zaeef (2000–2001)
 Nanguyalai Tarzi (2002–2007)
 Mohammad Anwar Anwarzai (31 July 2007 – 4 September 2008)
 Majnoon Gulab (acting) (2008–2011)
 Mohammad Omar Daudzai (April 2011 – August 2013)
 Janan Mosazai (November 2013 – January 2016)
 Omar Zakhilwal (February 2016 – November 2018)
 Atif Mashal (November 2018 – July 2020)
 Najibullah Alikhel (September 2020 – October 2021)
 Sardar Ahmed Khan Shakeeb (chargé d'affaires; 29 October 2021 – present)

See also

 List of ambassadors of Afghanistan
 List of ambassadors of Pakistan to Afghanistan

Notes

References

 
Pakistan
Afghanistan